Manfred Klaus Warmuth is a researcher and formerly a professor at the University of California, Santa Cruz.  His main research interest is computational learning theory with a special focus on online learning algorithms.

Year of birth missing (living people)
Living people
University of California, Santa Cruz faculty
University of Colorado alumni